Guelmim-Oued Noun is one of the twelve regions of Morocco. The southeastern part of the region is located in the disputed territory of Western Sahara and a small strip of land in this area is administered by the Sahrawi Arab Democratic Republic. The region as a whole covers an area of 46,108 km2 and had a population of 433,757 as of the 2014 Moroccan census. The capital of the region is Guelmim.

Geography
Guelmim-Oued Noun borders the regions of Souss-Massa to the northeast and Laâyoune-Sakia El Hamra to the south. It borders Algeria's Tindouf Province to the east and Mauritania's Tiris Zemmour Region to the southeast. Long stretches of virgin beach line its Atlantic coast in the northwest. The region is bisected by the usually dry lower course of the Draa River which runs east to west. The capital Guelmim and the Noun River (Wad Noun) are located in the north and together give the region its name. A portion of the Moroccan Wall is located in the southeastern corner of the region: the area to its east is under the control of the Sahrawi Arab Democratic Republic.

History
Guelmim-Oued Noun was formed in September 2015 by merging Sidi Ifni Province, formerly part of Souss-Massa-Drâa region, with three provinces from the former Guelmim-Es Semara region.

Government
Abderrahim Ben Bouaida was elected as the regional council's first president on 14 September 2015. He is a member of the National Rally of Independents (RNI). Mohamed Benribak was appointed governor (wali) of the region on 13 October 2015. He was succeeded by Mohamed Ennajem Abhai in 2017.

Subdivisions

Guelmim-Oued Noun comprises four provinces:

Assa-Zag Province
Guelmim Province
Sidi Ifni Province
Tan-Tan Province

Economy and infrastructure
Fishing is an important economic activity: there are ports at Sidi Ifni and at El Ouatia. Beach tourism is under development. The major roads in the region are the N1 and N12. There are airports at Guelmim and Tan-Tan.

References

 
Geography of Western Sahara